Gol Zar (also Romanized as Gol Zār and Golzār; also known as Gol ‘Az̄ār, Golīzār, Gol Mazār, Gol ‘oz̄ār, Golūzar, Gulezār, and Kyulyazar) is a village in Zolbin Rural District, Yamchi District, Marand County, East Azerbaijan Province, Iran. At the 2006 census, its population was 155, in 38 families.

References 

Populated places in Marand County